Ernest Faut (Ghent, 27 January 1879 - Leuven, 17 October 1961) was a Flemish - Belgian painter. He was a draftsman, painter and lithographer of decorative works, landscapes, interiors, psychological portraits, religious scenes, churches and beguinages.

Life and work 
Ernest Faut started his education at the Academy of Brussels with Constant Montald and also studied at the Academy of Leuven with Constantin Meunier. He was a professor for forty years (until 1944) at the Academy of Leuven, of which he later became director.

He delivered technically very strong paintings, with a delicate and sensitive range of colors. Faut also used the chiaroscuro technique. In the 1930s, his work mainly featured symbolic scenes with a late after-effect of Art Nouveau influences. Some paintings are characterized by a hazy melancholy.

His work is dispersed in several museums, including the M – Museum of Leuven.

Gallery

Bibliography
 Marc Eeemans, Biografische woordenboek der Belgische kunstenaars van 1830 tot 1970, 1979, vol. 1, p. 216
 Paul Piron, De Belgische beeldende kunstenaars uit de 19de en 20ste eeuw, 1999, vol. 1, p. 550
 La Renaissance du Livre, Le dictionnaire des peintres Belges du XIVe siècle à nos jours Bruxelles, 1994

References

1879 births
1961 deaths
Painters from Ghent
19th-century Flemish painters
19th-century Belgian painters
19th-century Belgian male artists
20th-century Belgian painters
20th-century Belgian male artists